Aqua regia (from Latin, literally "regal water" or "royal water") is a mixture of nitric acid and hydrochloric acid, optimally in a molar ratio of 1:3. Aqua regia is a fuming liquid. Freshly prepared aqua regia is colorless, but it turns yellow, orange or red within seconds from the formation of nitrosyl chloride and nitrogen dioxide. It was named by alchemists because it can dissolve the noble metals gold and platinum, though not all metals.

Preparation and decomposition 
Upon mixing of concentrated hydrochloric acid and concentrated nitric acid, chemical reactions occur. These reactions result in the volatile products nitrosyl chloride and chlorine gas:

 

as evidenced by the fuming nature and characteristic yellow color of aqua regia. As the volatile products escape from solution, aqua regia loses its potency. Nitrosyl chloride (NOCl) can further decompose into nitric oxide (NO) and elemental chlorine:

 

This dissociation is equilibrium-limited. Therefore, in addition to nitrosyl chloride and chlorine, the fumes over aqua regia also contain nitric oxide (NO). Because nitric oxide readily reacts with atmospheric oxygen, the gases produced also contain nitrogen dioxide,  (red fume):

Applications
Aqua regia is primarily used to produce chloroauric acid, the electrolyte in the Wohlwill process for refining the highest purity (99.999%) gold.

Aqua regia is also used in etching and in specific analytic procedures. It is also used in some laboratories to clean glassware of organic compounds and metal particles. This method is preferred among most over the more traditional chromic acid bath for cleaning NMR tubes, because no traces of paramagnetic chromium can remain to spoil spectra. While chromic acid baths are discouraged because of the high toxicity of chromium and the potential for explosions, aqua regia is itself very corrosive and has been implicated in several explosions due to mishandling.

Because its components react quickly, resulting in its decomposition, aqua regia quickly loses its effectiveness (yet remains a strong acid), so its components are usually only mixed immediately before use.

While local regulations may vary, aqua regia may be disposed of by careful neutralization, before being poured down the sink. If there is contamination by dissolved metals, the neutralized solution should be collected for disposal.

Chemistry

Dissolving gold

Aqua regia dissolves gold, although neither constituent acid will do so alone. Nitric acid is a powerful oxidizer, which will actually dissolve a virtually undetectable amount of gold, forming gold(III) ions. The hydrochloric acid provides a ready supply of chloride ions, which react with the gold ions to produce tetrachloroaurate(III) anions, also in solution. The reaction with hydrochloric acid is an equilibrium reaction that favors formation of tetrachloroaurate(III) anions. This results in a removal of gold ions from solution and allows further oxidation of gold to take place. The gold dissolves to become chloroauric acid. In addition, gold may be dissolved by the chlorine present in aqua regia. Appropriate equations are:

 Au + 3  + 4 HCl   + 3  +  + 2 
or
 Au +  + 4 HCl   + NO +  + .

Solid tetrachloroauric acid may be isolated by evaporating the excess aqua regia, and decomposing the residual nitric acid by repeatedly heating the solution with additional hydrochloric acid. That step reduces nitric acid (see decomposition of aqua regia). If elemental gold is desired, it may be selectively reduced with reducing agents such as sulfur dioxide, hydrazine, oxalic acid, etc. The equation for the reduction of oxidized gold by sulfur dioxide is the following:

Dissolving platinum
Similar equations can be written for platinum. As with gold, the oxidation reaction can be written with either nitric oxide or nitrogen dioxide as the nitrogen oxide product:

The oxidized platinum ion then reacts with chloride ions resulting in the chloroplatinate ion:

Experimental evidence reveals that the reaction of platinum with aqua regia is considerably more complex. The initial reactions produce a mixture of chloroplatinous acid and nitrosoplatinic chloride. The nitrosoplatinic chloride is a solid product. If full dissolution of the platinum is desired, repeated extractions of the residual solids with concentrated hydrochloric acid must be performed:

and

The chloroplatinous acid can be oxidized to chloroplatinic acid by saturating the solution with molecular chlorine while heating:

Dissolving platinum solids in aqua regia was the mode of discovery for the densest metals, iridium and osmium, both of which are found in platinum ores and are not dissolved by aqua regia, instead collecting as insoluble metallic powder (elemental Ir, Os) on the base of the vessel.

Precipitating dissolved platinum
As a practical matter, when platinum group metals are purified through dissolution in aqua regia, gold (commonly associated with PGMs) is precipitated by treatment with iron(II) chloride. Platinum in the filtrate, as hexachloroplatinate(IV), is converted to ammonium hexachloroplatinate by the addition of ammonium chloride. This ammonium salt is extremely insoluble, and it can be filtered off. Ignition (strong heating) converts it to platinum metal:

Unprecipitated hexachloroplatinate(IV) is reduced with elemental zinc, and a similar method is suitable for small scale recovery of platinum from laboratory residues.

Reaction with tin
Aqua regia reacts with tin to form tin(IV) chloride, containing tin in its highest oxidation state:

Reaction with other substances
It can react with iron pyrite to form Iron(III) chloride:

History
Aqua regia first appeared in the De inventione veritatis ("On the Discovery of Truth") by pseudo-Geber (after ), who produced it by adding sal ammoniac (ammonium chloride) to nitric acid. The preparation of aqua regia by directly mixing hydrochloric acid with nitric acid only became possible after the discovery in the late sixteenth century of the process by which free hydrochloric acid can be produced.

The third of Basil Valentine's keys shows a dragon in the foreground and a fox eating a rooster in the background. The rooster symbolizes gold (from its association with sunrise and the sun's association with gold), and the fox represents aqua regia. The repetitive dissolving, heating, and redissolving (the rooster eating the fox eating the rooster) leads to the buildup of chlorine gas in the flask. The gold then crystallizes in the form of gold(III) chloride, whose red crystals Basil called "the rose of our masters" and "the red dragon's blood". The reaction was not reported again in the chemical literature until 1895.

Antoine Lavoisier called aqua regia nitro-muriatic acid in 1789.

When Germany invaded Denmark in World War II, Hungarian chemist George de Hevesy dissolved the gold Nobel Prizes of German physicists Max von Laue (1914) and James Franck (1925) in aqua regia to prevent the Nazis from confiscating them. The German government had prohibited Germans from accepting or keeping any Nobel Prize after jailed peace activist Carl von Ossietzky had received the Nobel Peace Prize in 1935. De Hevesy placed the resulting solution on a shelf in his laboratory at the Niels Bohr Institute. It was subsequently ignored by the Nazis who thought the jar—one of perhaps hundreds on the shelving—contained common chemicals. After the war, de Hevesy returned to find the solution undisturbed and precipitated the gold out of the acid. The gold was returned to the Royal Swedish Academy of Sciences and the Nobel Foundation. They re-cast the medals and again presented them to Laue and Franck.

See also 
 
  sometimes also used to clean glassware

Notes

References

External links
 Chemistry Comes Alive! Aqua Regia
 Aqua Regia at The Periodic Table of Videos (University of Nottingham)
 Demonstration of Gold Coin Dissolving in Acid (Aqua Regia)

Gold
Alchemical substances
Oxidizing mixtures
Oxidizing acids
Mineral acids